Blessed Raynald of Bar (died 16 December 1150) was the fifth Abbot of Cîteaux from 1134 until his death. He succeeded the deposed Guy and under him the Cistercian Order prospered and grew.

Raynald was the second son of Count Milo II of Bar-sur-Seine and Matilda of Noyers. He became a monk at Clairvaux Abbey and a personal friend of Bernard of Clairvaux.

Raynald is generally credited with compiling the Instituta generalis capituli apud Cistercium, the earliest collection of the decisions of the Cistercian general chapter, and may also be credited with the shorter Capitula, a summary and rearrangement of the Instituta.

Notes

Sources

1150 deaths
French abbots
Cistercian abbots general